Cole Braden Gillespie (born June 20, 1984) is an American former professional baseball outfielder. He played in Major League Baseball (MLB) for the Arizona Diamondbacks, San Francisco Giants, Chicago Cubs, Seattle Mariners, Toronto Blue Jays, and Miami Marlins.

Amateur career
Gillespie was born in Portland, Oregon and raised in West Linn, Oregon, attending West Linn High School, the alma of former MLB pitcher Mitch Williams. For West Linn, Gillespie was a three-year letterman and won All-State honors as a shortstop and was also a standout pitcher. Gillespie also competed in football and basketball at West Linn, and later attended Oregon State University. After redshirting his freshman year at Oregon State, Gillespie won the Most Improved Player award his junior season and then later became a captain of the team. As a senior captain, Gillespie helped lead the Beavers to the 2006 Division I National Championship over the North Carolina Tar Heels and was also named the Pacific-10 Conference Player of the Year.

Career

Milwaukee Brewers
Gillespie was drafted by the Milwaukee Brewers in the third round of the 2006 Major League Baseball Draft. After going pro in 2006, Gillespie played for their Rookie league Helena Brewers. He was promoted to the Class A-Advanced Brevard County Manatees in 2007. Gillespie spent the entire 2008 season with the Double-A Huntsville Stars. In 2009, he was promoted to the Triple-A Nashville Sounds.

Arizona Diamondbacks
In late July 2009, he was traded to the Arizona Diamondbacks with Roque Mercedes for Felipe López and assigned to Triple-A Reno. Following the season, he was added to the 40 man roster to protect him from the Rule 5 Draft, and made his major league debut in a pinch hitting opportunity on April 21, hitting a double and later scoring a run.

San Francisco Giants
On December 21, 2012, Gillespie signed a minor league contract with the San Francisco Giants. On July 5, 2013, the Giants purchased his contract and he joined the big league club. After going hitless in 10 plate appearances, he was designated for assignment on July 9, 2013.

Chicago Cubs
On July 13, 2013, the Chicago Cubs claimed Gillespie off waivers. He was activated on July 14, and got a pinch hit single that night in the eighth inning against the St. Louis Cardinals. He was designated for assignment on September 4, 2013.

Seattle Mariners
Gillespie signed a minor league deal with the Seattle Mariners in December 2013. He was added to the 25 man roster, starting in left field for the Mariners on April 25, 2014. Going into a June 10 game against the New York Yankees, Gillespie was batting .327 with four multi-hit games, and batted in the cleanup spot for the first time in his major league career. He was designated for assignment on July 4.

Toronto Blue Jays
On July 5, 2014, Gillespie was claimed off waivers from the Seattle Mariners by the Toronto Blue Jays. Kenny Wilson was designated for assignment to make room for Gillespie. He made his debut with Toronto on July 6 against the Oakland Athletics. He was assigned outright to the Triple-A Buffalo Bisons on August 3. He elected free agency after the season ended.

Miami Marlins
Gillespie signed a minor league contract with the Miami Marlins on December 6, 2014.

He had his contract purchased by the Miami Marlins on June 27, 2015.

Pericos de Puebla
On February 27, 2017, Gillespie signed with the Pericos de Puebla of the Mexican Baseball League.

Acerceros de Monclova
On May 20, 2017, he was traded to the Acereros de Monclova for first baseman Nate Freiman. He was released on June 4, 2017.

Sugar Land Skeeters
On June 16, 2017, Gillespie signed with the Sugar Land Skeeters of the Atlantic League of Professional Baseball. He became a free agent after the 2017 season.

San Diego Padres
On February 28, 2018, Gillespie signed a minor-league contract with the San Diego Padres. He was released on May 3, 2018.

References

External links

1984 births
Living people
Acereros de Monclova players
American expatriate baseball players in Canada
American expatriate baseball players in Mexico
Arizona Diamondbacks players
Baseball players from Portland, Oregon
Brevard County Manatees players
Buffalo Bisons (minor league) players
Chicago Cubs players
Dunedin Blue Jays players
Fresno Grizzlies players
Gulf Coast Blue Jays players
Helena Brewers players
Huntsville Stars players
Major League Baseball outfielders
Mexican League baseball outfielders
Miami Marlins players
Nashville Sounds players
New Orleans Zephyrs players
Oregon State Beavers baseball players
People from West Linn, Oregon
Pericos de Puebla players
Reno Aces players
San Francisco Giants players
Scottsdale Scorpions players
Seattle Mariners players
Sugar Land Skeeters players
Tacoma Rainiers players
Tomateros de Culiacán players
Toronto Blue Jays players
All-American college baseball players